Miracle Cure may refer to:
Miracle Mineral Supplement, chlorine dioxide falsely promoted as a cure for illnesses
"Miracle Cure" (Diagnosis: Murder), an episode of Diagnosis: Murder
Miracle Cure (novel), a 1996 novel by Harlan Coben
"Miracle Cure" (song), a song by The Who
"Miracle Cure", a song by Blank & Jones from their 2007 album The Logic of Pleasure